Ferndale is an unincorporated community in Nockamixon Township in Bucks County, Pennsylvania, United States. Ferndale is located at the intersection of Pennsylvania Route 611 and Church Hill Road/Center Hill Road.

References

Unincorporated communities in Bucks County, Pennsylvania
Unincorporated communities in Pennsylvania